A Daughter in Revolt is a 1927 British silent comedy film directed by Harry Hughes and starring Mabel Poulton, Edward O'Neill and Lilian Oldland.

Cast
 Mabel Poulton as Aimee Scroope  
 Edward O'Neill as Lord Scroope  
 Patrick Susands as Billy Spencer  
 Lilian Oldland as Georgina Berners  
 Patrick Aherne as Jackie the Climber  
 Hermione Baddeley as Calamity Kate 
 Ena Grossmith as Snooks  
 Marie Ault as Mrs. Dale  
 Daisy Campbell as Lady Scroope  
 Neil Curtis as Alexandre Lambe  
 Gertrude Sterroll as Lady Erythea Lambe

References

Bibliography
 Goble, Alan. The Complete Index to Literary Sources in Film. Walter de Gruyter, 1999.

External links

1927 films
British comedy films
British silent feature films
1927 comedy films
Films directed by Harry Hughes
British black-and-white films
1920s English-language films
1920s British films
Silent comedy films